"I Was Born This Way" is a disco song written by Chris Spierer and Bunny Jones. The song was first recorded by Valentino, released in 1975, then by Carl Bean in 1977 (both artists for Motown).  

The record was first released on the Motown-distributed Gaiee Records and performed by Valentino (real name Charles Harris). Frankie Crocker of WBLS in New York first aired the song and it was an instant hit. For the past 46 years since it was written, it has become an anthem for the gay community and has been on countless compilation albums as well as being (sampled) on other recordings many times.

Background
The writers, Spierer and Jones, wanted to write a gay anthem and make the plight on gay issues known and bring it to the forefront.
The song's lyrics are about a man who proclaims that he's a homosexual and that he was "born this way". It was one of the first gay disco songs written specifically for the gay community, before the Village People wave.

Success of each version 
Valentino's version was a success in UK (where it was a #1 disco hit) and in the USA.

In 1978, the Carl Bean version on Motown Records became a club hit on the Billboard National Disco Action, Top 40 chart, peaking at #15. The song was remixed by Shep Pettibone and Bruce Forest in 1986, and along with a mix by Timmy Regisford was re-released on Next Plateau records. The "Better Days" mix became a huge club anthem during the 80s. The song was remixed again in 1995 on Next Plateau Records.

Other recordings
 In 2005, the Pet Shop Boys' included it on their 20th anniversary album Back to Mine. West End Records released a CD mixed by DJ Gomi which included six versions of the song as well as a two-part 12" Vinyl Edition.
 In 2008, Magnus Carlsson, Sweden's popular gay male vocalist, re-recorded three versions of "I Was Born This Way" in addition to Paul Oskar of Iceland. Magnus Carlsson can be seen performing "I Was Born This Way" on YouTube as well as Marty Thomas of the hit Broadway musical Wicked.
 Two versions of "I Was Born This Way" (Bean's, and a newer recording by Jimmy Somerville) were featured in the 2006 independent film Another Gay Movie. Bean went on to entitle his autobiography I Was Born This Way.

Influence and samples
In 2011, shortly after the release of the album "Born This Way", the American singer and songwriter Lady Gaga revealed in an interview with radio show host Howard Stern that the album title, as well as the title track, were inspired by Carl Bean's earlier use of the expression.
It was also sampled in 1999 by Adam Blake and Stuart Price, using the alias Pour Homme, as "Born this Way". It was a tremendous hit in Europe.

References

External links 

American disco songs
LGBT-related songs
Carl Bean songs
Jimmy Somerville songs
1975 songs